The Augustusberg is a hill of Saxony, southeastern Germany.

Hills of Saxony
Mountains of the Ore Mountains